Charlie Yelverton (born December 5, 1948) is a retired American professional basketball player. At a height of 1.88 m (6 ft 2 in) tall, he played as shooting guard-small forward. He is a member of the New York State Basketball Hall of Fame.

College career
Yelverton played college basketball at Fordham, with the Fordham Rams, from 1968 to 1971. He won the Haggerty Award in 1971, and was also an UPI All-American Third Team selection in (1971). Fordham retired Yelverton's jersey number 34 in 2023.

Professional career
Yelverton was drafted 25th overall by the Portland Trail Blazers, in the 1971 NBA draft, but only appeared in one NBA season. 

During a game on February 1, 1972, Yelverton did not participate in pre-game warmups and sat on the bench during the singing on the US national anthem. The Oregonian reported his actions were in protest of Portland's release of Willie McCarter. Blazers forward Sidney Wicks was accused of playing lackadaisical defense during the game as his protest. Yelverton told the New York Post in 2016 his protest was in response to the Vietnam War and capitalism. Portland head coach Rolland Todd was fired the next day for failing to handle the situation and Yelverton went on to play 24 more games for the Blazers. He was waived on September 1972, shortly before the Blazers were scheduled to travel to Hawaii for a pre-season tournament between NBA and ABA teams. 

In the summer of 1973, Yelverton was invited the training camp of the ABA Carolina Cougars at Elon University in Elon, North Carolina. He was not offered a contract at the conclusion of the camp.

Yelverton then headed to Europe, where he played with Olympiacos in Greece, and Ignis Varese in Italy. He helped Ignis Varèse to win the 1975 EuroLeague title, and he also played with the same team in two other EuroLeague Finals, in 1978 and 1979. He also won the 1978 Italian League title, while in Varèse.
 
On February 3, 2008, Yelverton was among the 105 player nominees for the 50 Greatest EuroLeague Contributors list, which commemorated the fiftieth anniversary of the EuroLeague competition.

References

External links 
NBA Profile and Stats at Basketball-Reference.com
EuroLeague 50 Greatest Contributors Nominees

1948 births
Living people
All-American college men's basketball players
American expatriate basketball people in Greece
American expatriate basketball people in Italy
American expatriate basketball people in Switzerland
American men's basketball players
Basket Brescia Leonessa players
Basketball players from New York City
Fordham Rams men's basketball players
Olympiacos B.C. players
Pallacanestro Varese players
Portland Trail Blazers draft picks
Portland Trail Blazers players
Shooting guards
Small forwards